Scholars agree that Japanese armour first appeared in the 4th century, with the discovery of the cuirass and basic helmets in graves.  During the Heian period (794-1185), the unique Japanese samurai armour ō-yoroi and dō-maru appeared. The Japanese cuirass evolved into the more familiar style of body armour worn by the samurai known as the dou or dō, with the use of leather straps (nerigawa), and lacquer for weatherproofing. Leather and/or iron scales were also used to construct samurai armours, with leather and eventually silk lace used to connect the individual scales (kozane) of these cuirasses. In the 16th century, Japan began trading with Europe, during what would become known as the Nanban trade. This was the first time matchlock muskets were imported, and as they became mass-produced domestically, samurai needed lighter and more protective armour. As a result, a new style of armour called tosei-gusoku (gusoku), which means modern armour, appeared. When a united Japan entered the peaceful Edo period, samurai continued to use both plate and lamellar armour as a symbol of their status.

Ōyamazumi Shrine is known as a treasure house of Japanese armour. It houses 40% of Japanese armour that has been designated as a National treasure and an Important Cultural Property. Kasuga Grand Shrine is also known as a treasure house of valuable armour.

Every year on Children's Day, May 5, Japanese households display miniature samurai armor and kabuto (helmets) in keeping with the tradition of Tango no Sekku. In feudal times, real samurai armor, kabuto, and tachi were displayed.

History

Earliest Japanese armour is thought to have evolved from the armour used in ancient China. Cuirasses and helmets were manufactured in Japan as early as the 4th century CE. Tankō, worn by foot soldiers and keikō, worn by horsemen were both pre-samurai types of early Japanese cuirass constructed from iron plates connected together by leather thongs.

During the Heian period (794-1185), the unique Japanese samurai armour ō-yoroi and dō-maru appeared. Luxurious and heavily armed ō-yoroi were worn by senior mounted samurai, while the lighter dō-maru were worn by lower-class infantry samurai. The Japanese cuirass evolved into the more familiar style of armour worn by the samurai known as the dou or dō. Japanese armour makers started to use leather (nerigawa), and lacquer was used to weatherproof the armour parts. Leather and or iron scales were used to construct samurai armour, with leather and eventually silk lace used to connect the individual scales (kozane) from which these cuirasses were now being made. The artistic decoration of ō-yoroi reached its peak around the time of the Genpei War at the end of the Heian period. At the end of the 14th century, towards the end of the Kamakura period (1185-1333), even senior samurai often used lightweight dō-maru.

In the Kamakura period, the most simple style of armor called hara-ate (腹当) appeared, which protected only the front of the torso and the sides of the abdomen, and was worn by lower-ranked fighter. In the late Kamakura period, the haramaki (腹巻), which extended both ends of the hara-ate to the back, appeared. During the Nanbokuchō period (1336-1392), ashigaru (foot soldiers) and conscripted farmers joined the fighting on foot, increasing the demand for light, mobile, and inexpensive haramaki. Later, kabuto (helmets), men-yoroi (facial armor), and kote (gauntlet) were added to the haramaki, and even high-ranking samurai began to wear them.

In the Muromachi period (1336-1573), the production process of armor became simplified, and mass production became possible at a lower cost and faster than before. The scales of traditional armor were connected to each other with cords in a style called kebiki odoshi (毛引縅), which was so dense that the entire surface of the scales was covered with the cords. In this period, on the other hand, a new method called sugake odoshi (素懸縅) was adopted, in which the scales of armor were sparsely connected to each other by two cords. The method of overlapping armor scales was also simplified. The traditional style of armor scales was the honkozane (本小札), in which half of the scales were overlapped and connected to each other. In this period, on the other hand, a new style of scales called iyozane (伊予札) was developed, in which one-fourth of the scales were overlapped and connected to each other.

In the 16th century, Japan began trading with Europe during what would become known as the Nanban trade. Matchlock muskets were first introduced to Japan by the Portuguese in 1543. The matchlock muskets were named "Tanegashima" after the first island they arrived on. Soon after, when Japanese swordsmiths began to mass-produce matchlock muskets in Japan, the war in Japan changed completely. The samurai needed armour that was lighter and more protective. In addition, large-scale battles required armor that could be mass-produced. As a result, a new style of armour called tosei-gusoku (gusoku), which means modern armour, appeared. Gusoku evolved from the dō-maru lineage. Scales has changed to itazane (板札), which is made of relatively large iron plate or platy leather, and has improved its defenses. Itazane can also be said to replace a row of individual honkozane or iyozane with a single steel plate or platy of leather. Since the armour is no longer flexible, gusoku has changed its method to make it easier to put on and take off by opening and closing the armour with a hinge. The simplified structure of the armour makes it easier to manufacture, allowing armor makers to focus on design and increasing the variety of armour looks. For example, the iron plate was designed to imitate the chest of an old man, and dō-maru style gusoku was made by attaching colored threads to the surface of the iron plate. The type of gusoku, like the plate armour, in which the front and back dou are made from a single iron plate with a raised center and a V-shaped bottom, was called Nanban dou gusoku (Western type gusoku). Bullet resistant armours were developed called tameshi gusoku ("bullet tested"), allowing samurai to continue wearing their armour despite the use of firearms.

Samurai in this period, especially high ranking samurai such as daimyo, owned a lot of armor. For example, it has been confirmed that Tokugawa Ieyasu owned dozens of armor, and they are now owned by Kunōzan Tōshō-gū, Nikkō Tōshō-gū, Kishū Tōshō-gū, Tokugawa Art Museum, The Tokugawa Museum, Tokyo National Museum, etc.

The era of warfare called the Sengoku period (1467-1590) ended around 1600, when a united Japan entered the peaceful Edo period (1603-1868). Although samurai continued to use both plate and lamellar armour as a symbol of their status, traditional armours were no longer necessary for battles. For this reason, in the Edo period, armour in the style of the revival of the medieval period, incorporating gorgeous ō-yoroi and dō-maru designs, became popular. During the Edo period lightweight, portable, and secret hidden armours became popular, since personal protection was still needed. Civil strife, duels, assassinations, and peasant revolts all required the use of armours such as the kusari katabira (chain armour jacket) and armoured sleeves, as well as other types of armour which could be worn under ordinary clothing. Edo period samurai were in charge of internal security and would wear various types of kusari gusoku (chain armour) and shin and arm protection as well as forehead protectors (hachi-gane).

Armour continued to be worn and used in Japan until the end of the samurai era (Meiji era) in the 1860s, with the last use of samurai armour happening in 1877 during the Satsuma Rebellion.

Construction

Japanese armour was generally constructed from many small iron (tetsu) and/or leather (nerigawa) scales (kozane) and/or plates (ita-mono), connected to each other by rivets and macramé cords (odoshi) made from leather and/or braided silk, and/or chain armour (kusari). Noble families had silk cords made in specific patterns and colors of silk thread. Many of these cords were constructed of well over 100 strands of silk. Making these special silk cords could take many months of steady work, just to complete enough for one suit of armour. These armour plates were usually attached to a cloth or leather backing. Japanese armour was designed to be as lightweight as possible as the samurai had many tasks including riding a horse and archery in addition to swordsmanship. The armour was usually brightly lacquered to protect against the harsh Japanese climate. Chain armour (kusari) was also used to construct individual armour pieces and full suits of kusari were even used.

Individual armour parts

A full suit of traditional Samurai armour could include the following items:
Dou or dō, a chest armour made up of iron and or leather plates of various sizes and shapes with pendents
Kusazuri made from iron or leather plates hanging from the front and back of the dou (dō) to protect the lower body and upper leg.
Sode, large rectangular shoulder protection made from iron and or leather plates.
Kote, armoured glove like sleeves which extended to the shoulder  or han kote (kote gauntlets) which covered the forearms. Kote were made from cloth covered with iron plates of various size and shape, connected by chain armour (kusari).
Kabuto, a helmet made from iron or leather plates (from 3 to over 100 plates) riveted together. A neck guard shikoro made from several layers of curved iron or leather strips was suspended from the bottom edge of the kabuto.
Mengu, various types of lacquered metal and or leather facial armour designed in a way that the top heavy helmet kabuto could be tied and secured to them by various metal posts.  Mengu had  throat guards yodare-kake made from several rows of iron or leather plates or kusari (chain armour) sewn to a cloth backing, suspended from the bottom edge.
Haidate, thigh guards which tied around the waist and covered the thighs. These were made from cloth with small iron and or leather plates of various size and shape, usually connected to each other by chain armour (kusari) and sewn to the cloth.
Suneate, shin guards made from iron splints connected together by chain armour (kusari) and sewn to cloth and tied around the calf.

Auxiliary armours
 Guruwa, a type of throat and neck protector.
 Nodowa, a type of throat and neck guard.
 Tate-eri, the tate-eri is a small padded pillow like piece with a standing armored collar that sits on the shoulder to protect from the weight of the dou (dō). The standing collar would be lined with kikko armour to protect the neck.
 Manju no wa, the manju no wa, (also manjunowa or manju nowa) is a combination of shoulder pads, collar and armpit guards in one that protected the upper chest area. Manju no wa were covered with kusari (chain armour), karuta (small armour plates), or kikko (brigandine), these armours or a combination of them were sewn to a cloth backing. The armour could be exposed or hidden between a layer of cloth. When worn the manju no wa looked like a small tight fitting vest. Manju no wa have small wings that would pass under the arm pit area from the back and attach to the front of the manju no wa.
 Manchira, the manchira is a type of armoured-vest covered with kusari (chain armour), karuta (small armour plates) or kikko (brigandine), these armours or a combination of them were sewn to a cloth backing. The armour could be exposed or hidden between a layer of cloth. Manchira are larger than manju no wa and protected the chest area and sometimes the neck and arm pit. Some manchira could be worn over the dou (dō).
 Wakibiki, the wakibiki is a simple rectangle of cloth covered with kusari (chain armour), karuta (small iron plates), or kikko (brigandine) these armorus or a combination of them were sewn to the cloth backing. Wakibiki could also be made from one solid piece of iron or hardened leather. The wakibiki had cords connected to them which allowed the wakibiki to hang from the shoulder, the wakibiki was then suspended over the exposed arm pit area. Wakibiki were either worn inside or outside the chest armour dou (dō) depending on the type.
 Yoroi zukin, cloth hoods with various types of armour sewn to the cloth.
 Kogake, armored tabi, a kind of sabaton that covered the top of the foot.
 Jingasa (war hat),  resembling the civilian coolie hat, issued to Ashigaru retainers, these could be made from metal or leather.
 Hachi gane/hitai ate, various types of light weight, portable, forehead protectors.
 Yoroi katabira, jackets covered with various types of armour, the armour could be exposed or hidden between layers of cloth.
 Yoroi hakama, pants covered with various types of armour, the armour could be exposed or hidden between layers of cloth.
 Kusari gusoku, chain mail.

Clothing worn with Japanese armour

Uwa-obi or himo, a cloth sash or belt used for attaching various weapons and other items such as the  katana, wakizashi and tantō.
Fundoshi, a simple loin cloth.
Kyahan or kiahan, tight gaiters made of cloth which covered the shins.
Hakama, a type of pants worn underneath the armour, hakama could be long or short like the kobakama.
Shitagi, a shirt worn underneath the armour.
Tabi, a cloth sock with divided toes.
Waraji, a woven sandal also known as zōri.
Kutsu, short riding boots made from leather.
Yugake, gloves that were worn under the kote.
Kegutsu, also known as tsuranuki, short leather shoes trimmed with bear fur.
Jinbaori, sleeveless jacket worn over Japanese armour.

Auxiliary items worn with Japanese armour
Sashimono, a small banner that is attached to the back of the dou (dō) by special fittings. Its purpose was to identify the wearer as friend or foe which was essential in the chaotic confusion of a pitched battle melee.
Horo, a cloak reserved for prestigious, high-ranking samurai. It provides additional protection from arrows.
Agemaki, a decorative tassel worn on the back of some dou and kabuto, the agemaki can also serve as an attachment point.
Jirushi, small identification flags or badges worn on the back of the helmet (kasa jirushi) or on the shoulder (sode jurishi).
Datemono/tatemono, crests of various shapes and sizes worn on several areas of the helmet (kabuto).
Yebira, arrow quiver for ya (arrows).

Types

Pre-samurai armour 
Armours that were worn in Japan before the samurai class evolved.
Tanko
Keiko

Kozane-gusoku

Kozane dou (dō) gusoku, are samurai armours with a lamellar cuirass constructed from individual scales (kozane), old fashioned armours used before the introduction of firearms in Japanese warfare (pre-Sengoku styles).

 Ō-yoroi, old style dou (dō) for mounted samurai, constructed with hon kozane (small individual scales).
 Dō-maru, old style dou (dō) that opened in the back, constructed with hon kozane (small individual scales), later period haramaki dou (dō) were made with armour plates.
 Hon kozane dou (dō) (small individual scales)
 Hon-iyozane dou (dō) or Nuinobe dou (dō) (large individual scales).

Tosei-gusoku
Tosei dou (dō) gusoku the so-called "modern armours" made from iron plates (ita-mono) instead of individual scales (kozane). Tosei-gusoku became prominent starting in the 1500s due to the advent of fire arms, new fighting tactics  and the need for additional protection.

 Okegawa Dou (dō) gusoku -  (tub-sided), refers to the tub-like shape of the dou (dō). There are two types of okegawa dou (dō): yokohagi (horizontal lames), and tatehagi (vertical lames).
 Hishinui dou (dō) or Hishi-toji dou (dō) -  chest armours with rows of prominent cross knots, usually an okegawa dou (dō).
 Munemenui dou (dō) or Unamenui dou (dō) - chest armours with a running stitch that goes horizontally across the surface of the dou (dō). This stitch of lacing runs along the surface of the lame looking like a dotted line paralleling the top.
 Dangae dou (dō) gusoku -  meaning "step-changing", a combination of two or more styles.
 Hotoke dou (dō) gusoku -  chest armour which is smooth and shows no signs of lames.
 Nio dou (dō) - embossed to resemble the emaciated torso of a starving monk or old man.
 Katahada-nugi dou (dō) - embossed to resemble a half-naked torso.
 Yukinoshita or Sendai dou (dō) - five plate, four hinge (go-mai) chest armour in the sendai or yukinoshita style.
 Hatomune dou (dō) gusoku - (pigeon-breast chest armour or cuirass) were inspired by European peascod breastplate armour. Hatomune dou (dō) have a sharp central ridge running vertically down the front.
 Uchidashi dou (dō) gusoku - Embossed or hammered out relief on the front.
 Nanban dou (dō) gusoku — Armour made on the base of late European armour
 Mōgami dou (dō) - five-plate, four hinge (go mai) chest armours with solid lames which are laced with sugake odoshi instead of being riveted.

Other types 
 Tatami-gusoku — Folding portable armour made from karuta armour (small square or rectangular plates) or kikko armour (small hexagon plates). Kusari gusoku (chain armour) is another form of tatami armour. Chochin kabuto (collapsible helmets) and hachi gane ( forehead protectors) that folded were also tatami armour.
 Tameshi-gusoku — bullet tested armour
 Gyorin kozane-gusoku — Scale armour
 Nanban-gusoku — western-inspired armour 
 Okasi-gusoku — lending or borrowing armour or munition armour, usually made for ashigaru (it might be  Tatami-do or any plain basic armour) often marked with clan insignia (mon).
 Uma yoroi, horse armour used in the Edo period for parades.
 Kusari gusoku Chain armour, armour made entirely of or the majority of the armour being made from kusari (chain mail) sewn to cloth.
 Kigote, a general term for several varieties of kote extended or completed by the addition of erisuwari (padded collar), kara-ate (shoulder pads) and wakibiki (armpit protectors). Examples of the kigote are the kote haramaki (kote which covers the belly), tominaga kote (kote that connect to each other in the front and back), sashinuki kote (kote made in the form of a short jacket).
 Yoroi katabira, armored jackets of various styles and sizes. Katabira were armored with kikko, hexagon armor plates, karuta, square or rectangular armor plates, or kusari, chain armor, or a combination of these armors.

Individual samurai armor parts

Rating of Japanese armors 
At present, by the Law for the Protection of Cultural Properties, important armors of high historical value are designated as Important Cultural Properties (Jūyō Bunkazai, 重要文化財), and special armors among them are designated as National Treasures (Kokuhō, 国宝). The armors designated as cultural properties based on the law of 1930, which was already abolished, have the rank next to Important Cultural Properties as Important Art Object (Jūyō Bijutsuhin, 重要美術品). In addition, The Association for the Research and Preservation of Japanese Helmets and Armor (:ja:日本甲冑武具研究保存会, Nihon Katchu Bugu Kenkyu Hozon Kai), a general incorporated association, rates high-value armors in five grades. In order of rank, they are, from highest to lowest, Juyo Bunka Shiryo (重要文化資料, Important cultural article), Koshu Tokubetsu Kicho Shiryo (甲種特別貴重資料, Especially precious article first grade), Tokubetsu Kicho Shiryo (特別貴重資料, Especially precious article.), Kicho Shiryo (貴重資料, Precious article), Hozon Shiryo (保存資料, Article worth preserving).

See also

 Dō (armour)
 Kabuto
 Karuta (Japanese armour)
 Kikko (Japanese armour)
 Kusari (Japanese mail armour)
 Lamellar armour
 Laminar armour
 O-yoroi
 Plated mail (tatami-do only)
 Shar-ayne — middle east armour which has similar construction as the Sendai or yukinoshita dou (dō)
 Suneate
 Tatami-dō
 Wakibiki

References

External links

Anthony Bryant's online Japanese armour manual
"The Samurai Archives" Japanese history site and forum
Shogun Samurai reenactment group 
Trevor Absolon's Samurai armour collectors forum.
Glossary of Japanese armor terms.
Nihon-no-katchu

 
Japanese clothing
Samurai weapons and equipment